Syburg is a borough (Stadtbezirk) of the city of Dortmund in the Ruhr district of North Rhine-Westphalia, Germany. Since 1929, it has been a borough of Dortmund, located in the city's south. It is part of the Hörde district.

Geschichte 
In 1929, it became a borough of Dortmund, as part of the  district. From 1 January 1975 it was part of the Hörde district.

Syburg has been an excursion destination of Dortmund's citizens. It was connected to Hörde since the beginning of the 20th century by the  tram. 

Syburg features several sites and monuments including:
 St. Peter, Syburg, a Romanesque church
 Hohensyburg, a ruined castle
 Kaiser-Wilhelm-Denkmal, a monument to Wilhelm I
 Vincketurm
 
 , an open-air stage
 , a trail connecting mining sites
 
 

The Hohensyburg is above the Hengsteysee, a dam of the Ruhr. Syburg features a golf course, the Wannebach valley, several restaurants and Dortmund's only campground.

References

External links 

 

Dortmund